Invicto is the fifth studio album by Puerto Rican singer-songwriter Tito El Bambino, released on November 19, 2012, by On Fire Music. The songs "Dame La Ola" and "Por Qué Les Mientes", a duet with Marc Anthony, are the first two singles of the album. "Tu Olor" was released as the third single. Invicto won the Lo Nuestro Award for Urban Album of the Year.

Track listing

Charts

Weekly charts

Year-end charts

Certification

References

2012 albums
Tito El Bambino albums